Andrea Eife (later Gemsleben, born 12 April 1956 in Leipzig) is a German former swimmer who competed in the 1972 Summer Olympics. She won a silver medal in the 4 × 100 m freestyle relay and finished fifth and sixth in the individual 200 m and 100 m freestyle events, respectively. At the 1973 World Aquatics Championships, she won a bronze medal in the 200 m freestyle and a gold medal in the 4 × 100 m freestyle relay, breaking the world record. The next year, she repeated these medal achievements at the 1974 European Aquatics Championships.

References

1956 births
Living people
German female freestyle swimmers
Olympic swimmers of East Germany
Swimmers at the 1972 Summer Olympics
Olympic silver medalists for East Germany
Medalists at the 1972 Summer Olympics
Swimmers from Leipzig
World Aquatics Championships medalists in swimming
European Aquatics Championships medalists in swimming
Olympic silver medalists in swimming
20th-century German women
21st-century German women